The Ross and Cromarty by-election was a Parliamentary by-election held on 14 June 1911. It returned one Member of Parliament (MP) to the House of Commons of the Parliament of the United Kingdom, elected by the first past the post voting system.

Vacancy
James Galloway Weir died. He had been the sitting Liberal MP since 1892.

Electoral history
This was a safe Liberal seat that the party had won at every election since 1847. Weir was returned at the last general election in December 1910. The previous contested election before that was the General Election in January 1910;

Candidates
The Liberal candidate selected to defend the seat was 31-year-old Ian Macpherson. He was educated at the University of Edinburgh and was called to the Bar, by the Middle Temple in 1906. He had contested Wigtownshire in January 1910 and East Renfrewshire in December 1910.
The Liberal Unionist candidate was the 35-year-old William Paterson Templeton. He was the Organising Secretary of Unionist Workers' League. He was standing for Parliament for the first time.

Campaign

Result
Polling took place on 14 June. Macpherson easily held the seat for the Liberals. Compared with the last contested election, his share of the vote only dropped by 1%;

Aftermath
A General Election was due to take place by the end of 1915. By the autumn of 1914, the following candidates had been adopted to contest that election. 
Liberal:Ian Macpherson
Due to the outbreak of war, the election was postponed. Macpherson supported the Lloyd George Coalition Government and received their endorsement at the 1918 election. 

Templeton did not contest the 1918 elections but was later elected as MP for Banffshire.

References

Ross and Cromarty by-election
Ross and Cromarty by-election
1910s elections in Scotland
Ross and Cromarty by-election
By-elections to the Parliament of the United Kingdom in Scottish constituencies
Politics of the county of Ross and Cromarty